Ericka Beckman is an American filmmaker who began to make films in the 1970s as part of the Pictures Generation. Her films concern the relationship between people and images, and how images structure people's perception of themselves and of reality.

Early life and education
Beckman earned her Bachelor of Fine Arts from Washington University in St. Louis in 1974 and attended the Whitney Museum Independent Study Program in 1975. She attended the California Institute of the Arts, originally as a visual artist, but later changed her focus to filmmaking.

Career in filmmaking
Beckman went to graduate school at CalArts in the late 1970s, and was influenced by the percussionist John Bergamo who taught there, and by Jack Goldstein's film loops. Beckman's early films were handmade and collaborative, integrating choreography, music, and singing, as well as sculptural objects. Her handmade cinematic effects have been compared to Fernand Léger's Ballet mécanique (1921) or Hans Richter's Ghosts Before Breakfast (1928) and predated the visual technology of MTV and special-effects blockbuster films like Tron.

Beckman stated about her early films, "As a young artist I was looking for a language to explain the relationship between the knowledge of one's self and movement in the physical world." Beckman describes the subject matter of her films: "Film is creating a reality through the makeshift. My films move backwards, using narrative structures as does the mind of anyone trying to grasp the meaning of images in his memory."

The Super-8 films that Beckman created and exhibited prior to 1978, such as White Man Has Clean Hands (1977) and Hit and Run (1977), used basic prop-constructions and do-it-yourself special effects. After reading Swiss child psychologist Jean Piaget's Genetic Epistemology, Beckman began her "Super-8 Trilogy." This trio of experimental films created between 1978 and 1980 included We Imitate; We Break Up (1978),  The Broken Rule (1979), and Out of Hand (1980), and featured split screens superimpositions and ingenious pixilations. In these films Beckman used herself and a rotating cast, including James Casebere, Mike Kelley, Matt Mullican, James Welling, Kirby Dick, and Paul McMahon, as performers.  The films combined childhood dream recollections with Piaget's ideas on the cognitive development of children. Beckman's "Super-8 Trilogy" demonstrated her ability to express her ideas using technical wizardry and poetic narrative. Out of Hand was one of the reasons the Whitney Biennial began to include Super-8 films.

Beckman is also known for her 30 minute non-linear narrative film Cinderella (1986), in which the fairy tale character becomes part of a game as a metaphor for society's restrictions on women. The film starred Gigi Kalweit and Mike Kelley; Brooke Halpin composed the music, with vocals by Katy Cavanaugh. Beckman's later films include Switch Center (2003), which was shot in Hungary in an abandoned water purification plant. The film's mostly male characters move in choreographed constant motion as they interact with their industrial environment, referencing the compromised history of Soviet-style collectivism.

Like other Pictures Generation artists, Beckman's films focus on the ways in which stereotypes shape an individual's self-image, revealing their origin in a generation raised on mass media. The kinetic movements of the actors are based on the "task-oriented" choreography of Lucinda Childs and Trisha Brown.

Beckman's work has been shown at the Whitney Museum of American Art and the Museum of Modern Art in New York.

Beckman's films Cinderella (1986) and You the Better (1983) were preserved by the Academy Film Archive in 2017 and 2019, respectively.

References

1951 births
Living people
Sam Fox School of Design & Visual Arts alumni
Washington University in St. Louis alumni
American women film directors
American experimental filmmakers
Women experimental filmmakers